Nino del Arco is a Spanish lawyer and former child actor.

He played Jesus along Daniel Martín and Marianne Koch in A Fistful of Dollars (1964), by Sergio Leone. He played Dieter in El niño y el muro (1965), by Ismael Rodríguez. He was the main character in El Cristo del océano (1971).

He played Pepín in La primera aventura (1965), and Juanito in La gran aventura (1969).

Filmography

References

External links

 
 

1958 births
Spanish male television actors
Spanish male film actors
Male actors from Madrid
Spanish male child actors
Film male child actors
20th-century Spanish lawyers
Living people
Male Spaghetti Western actors